A shadow biosphere is a hypothetical microbial biosphere of Earth that would use radically different biochemical and molecular processes from that of currently known life. Although life on Earth is relatively well studied, if a shadow biosphere exists it may still remain unnoticed, because the exploration of the microbial world targets primarily the biochemistry of the macro-organisms.

The hypothesis
It has been proposed that the early Earth hosted multiple origins of life, some of which produced chemical variations on life as we know it. Steven A. Benner, Alonso Ricardo, and Matthew A. Carrigan, biochemists at the University of Florida, argued that if organisms based on RNA once existed, they might still be alive today, unnoticed because they do not contain ribosomes, which are usually used to detect living microorganisms. They suggest searching for them in environments that are low in sulfur, environments that are spatially constrained (for example, minerals with pores smaller than one micrometre), or environments that cycle between extreme hot and cold.

Other proposed candidates for a shadow biosphere include organisms using different suites of amino acids in their proteins or different molecular units (e.g., bases or sugars) in their nucleic acids, having a chirality opposite of ours, using some of the nonstandard amino acids, or using arsenic instead of phosphorus, having a different genetic code, or even another kind of chemical for its genetic material that are not nucleic acids (DNA nor RNA) chains or biopolymers. Carol Cleland, a philosopher of science at the University of Colorado (Boulder), argues that desert varnish, whose status as biological or nonbiological has been debated since the time of Darwin, should be investigated as a potential candidate for a shadow biosphere.

Existence of a shadow biosphere could mean that life has evolved on Earth more than once, which means that microorganisms may exist on Earth which have no evolutionary connection with any other known form of life. It is suggested that if an alternate form of microbial life on Earth is discovered, the odds are good that life is also common elsewhere in the universe.

Criticism
Methods used by proponents and conclusions drawn from experiments that purport to show evidence of shadow biospheres have been criticized. For example, evidence that once seemed to support arsenic as a substitute for phosphorus in DNA could have resulted from lab or field contamination, and DNA that includes arsenic is chemically unstable.

See also

References

Further reading

 Conover, Emily. (2015)  'Shadow biosphere' might be hiding strange life right under our noses, Science News, Science
Cleland, C.E. (2006) Astrobiology Magazine A Shadow Biosphere
Cleland, C.E. (2007) Epistemological issues in the study of microbial life: alternative biospheres. Studies in the History and Philosophy of Biological and Biomedical Sciences 38:847–861.
Cleland, C. E. and Copley, S. D. (2005) The possibility of alternative microbial life on Earth. International Journal of Astrobiology 4(4), 165–173.
Davies, P. C. W., Lineweaver, C. H., Finding a Second Sample of Life on Earth, Astrobiology, vol. 5, no. 2, 2005, doi=10.1089/ast.2005.5.154
Wolfe-Simon,F., Davies,P.C.W. and Anbar, A.D. (2009) Did nature also choose arsenic? International Journal of Astrobiology, Cambridge University Press 
Pace, N. R. (1997) A molecular view of microbial diversity and the biosphere. Science, 274, 734–740.
Woese, C. R. (2004) The archaeal concept and the world it lives in: a retrospective. Photosynthesis Research, 80, 361–372.

External links
A Shadow Biosphere
Bacteria stir debate about 'shadow biosphere'
Alternate "Life" Styles: Scientists Predict The Possibility Of A Shadow Biosphere

Astrobiology
Ecology
Philosophy of biology
Hypothetical life forms